Marc Mortier (9 December 1948 – 3 May 2004) was CEO of Flanders Expo from its foundation in 1986 to 2002. Flanders Expo is the biggest event hall in Flanders, and the second biggest in Belgium (Flanders Expo's indoor surface is 55,000 m²). Mortier later became president of Febelux, the Federation of Exhibitions in Belgium and Luxemburg. Until 2002, many concerts took place in Flanders Expo. Hall 8's capacity is more than 13,000 people. 

Musicians who have performed at Flanders Expo include Tina Turner (12 times), Phil Collins, Bryan Adams, Prince, Elton John, Britney Spears, Paul McCartney, Joe Cocker, Whitney Houston, Barry White, U2, Nick Kamen, Eros Ramazzotti, Bon Jovi, Metallica and AC/DC. Flanders Expo is also the host of Europe's biggest indoor techno party (I love Techno) with more than 60,000 visitors in one day.

Mortier was an active member of the board of the soccer team K.A.A. Gent from 1988 until his death in 2004. After the degradation in 1988, Mortier consulted the Prime Minister of Belgium, Wilfried Martens, in order to establish an organisation named Foot Invest, to get the team back on track. Marc Mortier gathered at that time more than 50 million Belgian francs (1.25 million euros) in sponsoring in a couple of months and introduced VDK Spaarbank as the main sponsor. 

Mortier also was a member of the Board of 'Voetbalmagazine' (the Belgian national soccer magazine), 'Flanders Sports Arena, 'King Baudouin Foundation', 'The International Year Exposition of Flanders', 'The Festival of Flanders', and the Rotary Club (who honoured him individually with a Paul Harris Fellow One Star). 

Mortier died in hospital of a heart attack on 3 May 2004. He was 55, and was survived by his wife, Sylva Van der Stricht, and his three children, Caroline, Frederik and Bernard Mortier.

References

External links 
The Worldwide Organization Serving the Exhibition Industry
Het Nieuwsblad
De Standaard
Trends

Belgian chief executives
1948 births
2004 deaths